Gerrhonotus farri, also known commonly as Farr's alligator lizard and the Tamaulipan alligator lizard, is a species of lizard in the family Anguidae. The species is native to northeastern Mexico.

Etymology
The specific name, farri, is in honor of American herpetologist William L. Farr, who collected the holotype.

Geographic range
G. farri is endemic to the Mexican state of Tamaulipas.

Description
It has smooth dorsal scales, and its head is distinctly wider than its neck.

Reproduction
The mode of reproduction of G. farri is unknown.

References

Further reading
Bryson RW, Graham RW (2010). "A New Alligator Lizard from Northeastern Mexico". Herpetologica 66 (1): 92–98. (Gerrhonotus farri, new species).
Terán-Juárez SA, García-Padilla E, Mata-Silva V, Johnson JD, Wilson LD (2016). "The herpetofauna of Tamaulipas, Mexico: composition, distribution, and conservation status". Mesoamerican Herpetology 3: 43–113. (Gerrhonotus farri, p. 56). (in English, with an abstract in Spanish).

Gerrhonotus
Reptiles of Mexico
Reptiles described in 2010
Taxobox binomials not recognized by IUCN